Braian Miguel Angel "Chaco" Martínez (born 18 August 1999) is an Argentine professional footballer who plays as a forward for Aldosivi on loan from Independiente.

Professional career
Martínez joined the youth academy of in 2016 Independiente. On 9 August 2019, he signed his first contract with Independiente. Martínez made his professional debut with Independiente in a 2-1 Argentine Primera División loss to River Plate on 19 January 2020.

On 2 February 2022, Martínez joined Aldosivi on a loan until the end of 2022.

References

External links
 
 Indepentiente Profile

 

1999 births
Living people
Sportspeople from Chaco Province
Argentine footballers
Association football forwards
Club Atlético Independiente footballers
Aldosivi footballers
Argentine Primera División players